Tibiella may refer to:
 Tibiella (gastropod), a fossil genus of gastropods in the family Creseidae
 Tibiella (alga), a fossil genus of algae in the phylum Bacillariophyta